This is a list of notable people who were born or have lived in Kazan, Russia.

Born in Kazan

1700–1799 
 Gavrila Derzhavin (1743–1816), Russian poet
 Gavriil Kamenev (1772–1803), Russian poet, writer and translator
 Peter Zheltukhin (1777–1829), Russian general

1800–1899 
 Karl L. Littrow (1811–1877), Austrian astronomer
 Ivan Martynov (1821–1894), Russian Jesuit priest
 Alexander Zaytsev (1841–1910), Russian chemist
 Alexander Solovtsov (1847–1923), Russian chess master
 Stepan Smolensky (1848–1909), Russian choir director and scholar of ancient
 Vera Figner (1852–1942), Russian revolutionary and narodnik
 Evgeny Chirikov (1864–1932), Russian novelist, short story writer, dramatist, essayist and publicist
 Aleksandr Kotelnikov (1865–1944), Russian mathematician
 Pyotr Pertsov (1868–1947), Russian poet, publisher, editor, literary critic, journalist and memoirist
 Nikolay Bauman (1873–1905), Russian revolutionary of the Bolshevik party
 Feodor Chaliapin (1873–1938), Russian opera singer
 Ivan Grave (1874–1960), Russian and Soviet scientist in the field of artillery
 Sergey Namyotkin (1876–1950), Russian chemist
 Vladimir Adoratsky (1878–1945), Soviet communist historian and political theorist
 Sadri Maksudi Arsal (1879–1957), Tatar and Turkish statesman, scholar and thinker
 Sergey Malov (1880–1957), Russian Turkologist
 Nicolai A. Vasiliev (1880–1940), Russian logician, philosopher, psychologist, poet
 Nicolai Fechin (1881–1955), Russian-American painter
 Aleksandr Ivanovsky (1881–1968), Russian screenwriter and film director
 Valentin Dogiel (1882–1955), Russian and Soviet zoologist, specialized in parasitology and protozoology
 Fatix Ämirxan (1886–1926), Tatar classic writer, editor and publicist
 Boris Obukhov (1891-1937), naval officer, victim of Stalin's purges, Catholic convert from Orthodoxy
 Alexander Arkhangelsky (1892–1978), aircraft designer and doctor of technical sciences
 Vadim Shershenevich (1893–1942), Russian poet
 Gala Dalí (1894–1982), Russian wife of Salvador Dalí
 Evgeny Shvarts (1896–1958), Soviet writer and playwright

1900–1949 
 Mikhail Lavrentyev (1900–1980), Soviet mathematician and hydrodynamicist
 Alexandre Alexeieff (1901–1982), Russian artist, filmmaker and illustrator
 Alexander Kazembek (1902–1977), Russian émigré and political activist
 Alexander Luria (1902–1977), Soviet neuropsychologist and developmental psychologist
 Alexander Dubyago (1903–1959), Soviet astronomer and expert in theoretical astrophysics
 Nikolay Zabolotsky (1903–1958), Russian poet, children's writer and translator
 Aleksey Zhivotov (1904–1964), Russian composer
 Galina Kravchenko (1905–1996), Russian actress
 Sara Sadíqova (1906–1986), Soviet Tatar actress, singer and composer
 Alexander Vishnevsky (1906–1975), Soviet surgeon
 Vladimir Kotelnikov (1908–2005), Soviet information theory and radar astronomy pioneer
 Georgi Vinogradov (1908–1980), Russian tenor
 Kārlis Šteins (1911–1983), Latvian and Soviet astronomer
 Veronika Tushnova (1911–1965), Soviet poet and member of the Soviet Union of Writers
 Yitzchok Zilber (1917–2004), Russian-born Haredi Rabbi and a leader of the Russian baal teshuva movement
 Gregory Freiman (born 1926), Russian mathematician
 German Zonin (born 1926), Soviet Russian football coach and player
 Amina Adil (1930–2004), Tatar writer and Islamic theologian
 Sofia Gubaidulina (born 1931), Russian composer
 Vasily Aksyonov (1932–2009), Soviet and Russian novelist
 Mikhail Roshchin (1933–2010), Russian playwright, screenwriter and short story writer
 Albert Schwarz (born 1934), Soviet mathematician and a theoretical physicist
 Dmitry Fuchs (born 1939), mathematician, professor at the University of California, Davis
 Valery Popov (born 1938), Russian writer
 Igor Vulokh (1938–2012), Russian nonconformist artist of the 1960s
 Vladimir E. Zakharov (born 1939), Soviet and Russian mathematician and physicist
 Aida Vedishcheva (born 1941), Soviet and Russian singer of Jewish descent
 Natalia Gutman (born 1942), Russian cellist
 Albert Kapengut (born 1944), Soviet chess master
 Viktor Yerin (born 1944), Russian army general
 Gennady Yevryuzhikhin (1944–1998), Russian footballer
 Vyacheslav Bulavin (born 1946), Russian football coach and a former player
 Leonid Filatov (1946–2003), Soviet and Russian actor, director, poet, pamphleteer
 Talgat Tadzhuddin (born 1948), Chief Mufti of Russia
 Kamil Iskhakov (born 1949), Russian regional development minister's assistant of Tatar origin

1950–1975 
 Natalia Rom (born 1950), Soviet-born operatic soprano
 Lidiya Loginova (born 1951), Soviet volleyball player
 Valentin A. Bazhanov (born 1953), Russian professor, chairperson of Philosophy Department at Ulyanovsk State University
 Nailya Gilyazova (born 1953), Soviet fencer
 Youri Egorov (1954–1988), Soviet classical pianist
 Olga Knyazeva (1954–2015), Soviet fencer
 Valery Gerasimov (born 1955), Russian General and current Chief of the General Staff of the Armed Forces of Russia
 Rustem Adagamov (born 1961), influential Russian blogger
 Sergey Mavrin (born 1963), Russian musician and composer
 Alexandre Fadeev (born 1964), Russian competitive figure skater
 Marat Khusnullin (born 1966), Russian politician
 Aleksandr Tatarkin (born 1966), Russian professional footballer
 Ildar Ibragimov (born 1967), Russian-American chess Grandmaster
 Dmitry Balmin (born 1970), Russian ice hockey defender
 Denis Kapustin (born 1970), Russian triple jumper
 Alisa Galliamova (born 1972), Russian chess player
 Anna Gourari (born 1972), Russian classical concert pianist
 Rustem Khuzin (born 1972), Russian professional football coach and a former player
 Vasily Mosin (born 1972), Russian sport shooter
 Rustem Bulatov (1974–2008), Russian professional footballer
 Maria Manakova (born 1974), Russian and Serbian chess Grandmaster
 Ruslan Nigmatullin (born 1974), Russian footballer
 Roman Shaykhutdinov (born 1974), Russian politician, Deputy Prime Minister of the Republic of Tatarstan
 Marsel Tukhvatullin (born 1974), Russian football player
 Chulpan Khamatova (born 1975), Russian film, theater and TV actress of Volga Tatar origin
 Yevgeni Varlamov (born 1975), Russian football player

1976–1999 
 Denis Arkhipov (born 1979), Russian professional ice hockey player
 Sofya Gulyak (born 1979), Russian classical pianist
 Alexandre Dinerchtein (born 1980), professional Go player from Russia
 Maxim Sharafutdinov (born 1980), Russian journalist, television presenter of Channel One
 Svetlana Shikshina (born 1980), Russian professional Go player
 Evgeny Konstantinov (born 1981), Russian professional ice hockey goaltender
 Tatiana Kovylina (born 1981), Russian model
 Ruslan Mukhametshin (born 1981), Russian professional football player
 Nikolay Nikiforov (born 1982), Russian politician
 Ruslan Zainullin (born 1982), Russian professional ice hockey center
 MakSim (born 1983), Russian singer, songwriter and a music producer
 Dmitri Obukhov (born 1983), Russian professional ice hockey winger
 Venera Gimadieva (born 1984) Russian operatic soprano
 Marat Khairullin (born 1984), Russian-born Kazakh football attacking midfielder/forward
 Anastasiya Kolesnikova (born 1984), Russian Olympic gymnast
 Yelena Migunova (born 1984), Russian sprint athlete
 Rustem Mukhametshin (born 1984), Russian professional football player
 Eugenia Volodina (born 1984), Russian model
 Lenar Gilmullin (1985–2007), Russian football full-back of Tatar origin
 Anastasia Luppova (born 1985), Russian billiards player, the two-time European champion in Russian pyramid
 Alexander Rybakov (born 1985), Russian professional ice hockey forward
 Artyom Timofeev (born 1985), Russian chess grandmaster
 Aida Garifullina (born 1987), Russian operatic soprano
 Alsu Murtazina (born 1987), Russian triple jumper
 Kamilla Gafurzianova (born 1988), Russian female fencer
 Yana Martynova (born 1988), Russian swimmer
 Dinar Khafizullin (born 1989), Russian professional ice hockey defenceman
 Niyaz Nabeev (born 1989), Russian nordic combined skier
 Nail Zamaliyev (born 1989), Russian professional football player
 Kirill Petrov (born 1990), Russian professional ice hockey player
 Daria Shkurikhina (born 1990), Russian group rhythmic gymnast and Olympic champion
 Alexander Burmistrov (born 1991), Russian professional ice hockey player
 Emil Garipov (born 1991), Russian professional ice hockey goaltender of Tatar descent
 Maksim Zhestokov (born 1991), Russian football defender
 Natalia Zhukova (born 1992), Russian cross-country skier
 Andrey Makarov (born 1993), Russian professional ice hockey goaltender
 Albert Yarullin (born 1993), Russian professional ice hockey defenceman
 Evgenia Tarasova (born 1994), Russian pair skater
 Elmir Nabiullin (born 1995), Russian professional football player
 Veronika Kudermetova (born 1997), Russian tennis player

2000–2050 
 Dayana Kirillova (born 2002), Russian singer
 Kamila Valieva (born 2006), figure skater

Lived in Kazan 

 Joseph Johann von Littrow (1781–1840), Austrian astronomer
 Nikolai Lobachevsky (1792–1856), Russian mathematician and geometer
 Ğabdulla Tuqay (1886–1913), Tatar poet
 Yevgeny Zavoisky (1907–1976), Soviet physicist
 Rashid Nezhmetdinov (1912–1974), Soviet chess player, International Master and 5-time winner of the Russian Chess Championship
 Viktor Kolotov (1949–2000), Soviet footballer
 Taliya Habrieva (born 1958), Russian legal writer;  graduated in 1980 from the Law Faculty of Kazan State University
 Svetlana Demina (born 1961), Russian sport shooter
 Pavel Prygunov (born 1976), Russian professional footballer; made his professional debut in the Russian Second Division in 1994 for FC Rubin Kazan

Kazan
Kazan
List